This is a list of Green Lantern supporting characters.

In chronological order with name, first appearance and description.

Golden Age

Silver and Bronze Age

Modern Age

From alternate realities

In other media

See also 
 Green Lantern (comic book)
 List of Green Lanterns
 List of Green Lantern enemies
 List of Green Arrow supporting characters
 List of Superman supporting characters
 List of Wonder Woman supporting characters
 List of Batman supporting characters
 List of Aquaman supporting characters

References

External links
 Green Lantern Corps Web Page

Green Lantern characters
Lists of DC Comics characters
Lists of supporting characters in comics